Decoin is a French surname. Notable people with the surname include:

Didier Decoin (born 1945), French screenwriter
Henri Decoin (1890–1969), French film director, screenwriter and swimmer, father of Didier

French-language surnames